The Karl Spencer Lashley Award is awarded by The American Philosophical Society as a recognition of research on the integrative neuroscience of behavior. The award was established in 1957 by a gift from Dr. Karl Spencer Lashley.

Recipients 
 2022 Nicholas Spitzer 
 2021 Patricia K. Kuhl «in recognition of her fundamental discoveries concerning how human infants acquire language, and how brain structure and activity changes during language learning in both monolingual and bilingual children» 
 2020 Winrich Freiwald and Doris Tsao - "In recognition of their ground-breaking discoveries of primate cortical areas that selectively encode visual information about faces, the computational principles underlying face encoding in these areas, and the implications of these discoveries for social cognition."
2019 Wolfram Schultz
 2018  Catherine Dulac - "In recognition of her incisive studies of the molecular and circuit basis of instinctive behaviors mediated through olfactory systems in the mammalian brain"
 2017	Michael Shadlen - "In recognition of his pioneering experimental and theoretical studies of decision-making, identifying neural mechanisms that accumulate and convert sensory information toward behavioral choices" 
 2016	Charles G. Gross - "In recognition of his pioneering studies of the neurophysiology of higher visual functions and the neural basis of face recognition and object perception" 
 2015	David W. Tank - "In recognition of his pioneering application of intracellular recording and two-photon microscopy in awake animals, which has revealed new insights into the neural circuits underlying cognition" 
 2014	Edvard and May-Britt Moser - "In recognition of their discovery of grid cells in entorhinal cortex, and their pioneering physiological studies of hippocampus, which have transformed understanding of the neural computations underlying spatial memory"
 2013	J. Anthony Movshon - "In recognition of his studies of how neurons in the cerebral cortex process visual information and how cortical information processing enables seeing"
 2012	Eve Marder - "In recognition of her comprehensive work with a small nervous system, demonstrating general principles by which neuromodulatory substances reconfigure the operation of neuronal networks"
 2011	Joseph E. LeDoux - "In recognition of his seminal studies of the neural mechanisms of emotional learning, particularly fear learning and fear memory"
 2010	William T. Newsome - "In recognition of his pioneering studies of the primate visual system demonstrating the relation between perception and the activity of individual neurons"
 2009	James L. McGaugh - "In recognition of his comprehensive study of the biological processes that modulate the formation and consolidation of memory"
 2008	Eric Knudsen - "In recognition of his comprehensive study of visual and auditory perception in the owl and for his elucidation of how the auditory map is calibrated by the visual system during development"
 2007	Richard F. Thompson - "In recognition of his distinguished contributions to understanding the brain substrates of learning and memory"
 2006	Jon H. Kaas - "In recognition of his comprehensive analyses of the primate cerebral cortex, its evolution, functional organization, and plastic response to injury"
 2005	Bruce McEwen - "In recognition of his extensive demonstrations of the role of circulating steroid hormones as regulators of neuroplasticity and behavioral adaption"
 2004	Masakazu Konishi and Fernando Nottebohm - "In recognition of their fundamental contributions in identifying the organization and function of the avian brain systems for learning and executing birdsong"
 2003	Horace B. Barlow - "In recognition of his fundamental contributions to understanding how the eye and brain accomplish vision"
 2002	Jean-Pierre Changeux - "In recognition of his pioneering, comprehensive studies into the fundamental molecular mechanisms underlying interneuronal communication and their role in network formation, learning, and reward"
 2001	Edward G. Jones - "In recognition of his comprehensive determination of the organization of the thalamus and the basis for the dynamic regulation of cortical excitability"
 2000	Charles Stevens - "In recognition of his penetrating contributions to synaptic transmission and synaptic plasticity"
 1999	Michael Merzenich - "In recognition of his original contributions to cortical plasticity"
 1998	Michael I. Posner and Marcus E. Raichle - "Jointly, for their pioneering contributions to brain imaging"
 1996	Patricia S. Goldman-Rakic - "For seminal contributions to the current understanding of prefrontal cortex and its role in working memory and for effectively applying insights from basic biological sciences to mental health"
 1996	Mortimer Mishkin - "For his pioneering analysis of the memory and the perceptual systems of the brain, and his seminal contributions to the understanding of the higher nervous system function"
 1995	Larry R. Squire - "For his seminal contribution to the delineation of implicit and explicit memory systems in the brain"
 1994	Robert H. Wurtz - "For brilliant technical innovations in recording the activity of single visual neurons of alert, behaviorally-trained monkeys that made possible salient scientific discoveries relating individual nerve cells to visual perception and to the generation of eye movement"
 1993	Paul Greengard - "For his pioneering work on the molecular basis of signal transduction and vesicle mobilization in nerve cells"
 1992	Seymour Kety - "For major contributions to understanding the genetics of schizophrenia and depression, and for developing reliable methods for studying cerebral blood flow which paved the way for PET imaging of brain activity"
 1991	Sanford L. Palay - "For pioneering the study of the nervous system on the ultrastructural level, for revolutionizing understanding, and especially for his seminal contribution - characterization of the chemical synapse in the central nervous system"
 1990	Viktor Hamburger - "For pioneering the study of neuroembryology, and especially the landmark contributions to understanding neural cell death, nerve growth factor, and the developmental program for motor behavior"
 1989	Bela Julesz - "For his illuminating discoveries concerning the human visual capacity, particularly for stereoscopic vision, depth perception, and pattern recognition" 
 1989	Gian Franco Poggio - "For discoveries of visual cortical mechanisms in stereopsis and depth perception which have significantly influenced modern studies of the brain mechanisms in vision"
 1988	Seymour Benzer - "A pioneer in using genetic techniques to study the genetic code and the transfer of information from DNA to proteins. By a brilliant selection of suitable experimental systems, he has succeeded over the last twenty years in advancing these techniques and applying them to the analysis of development and behavior. These contributions have greatly expanded the power of the genetic approach in neurobiology and fostered a merger between molecular biology and neurobiology that is having profound consequences on every aspect of the field"
 1987	Louis Sokoloff - "For his elucidation of the physiological and biochemical processes involved in the metabolism of the brain and the application of these discoveries to the measurement of functional activity within that organ"
 1986	Pasko Rakic - "For his seminal contributions to the field of developmental neurobiology through research on the development of the central nervous system"
 1985	David Bodian - "In recognition of his fundamental neurobiological studies studies that laid the foundation for the successful development of a vaccine against poliomyelitis. He has continued to make important discoveries in the development and structure of the nervous system"
 1984	W. Maxwell Cowan - "For his long record of important contributions to understanding the embryological development of the brain"
 1983	Edward V. Evarts
 1982	Herbert H. Jasper
 1981	Eric R. Kandel
 1980	Curt P. Richter
 1979	Brenda Milner
 1978	Victor Percy Whittaker
 1977	Torsten Nils Wiesel and David Hunter Hubel
 1976	Roger Wolcott Sperry
 1975	Paul Weiss
 1974	Vernon Benjamin Mountcastle
 1973	Janos Szentagothai
 1972	Paul D. MacLean
 1971	Sir Wilfrid Le Gros Clark
 1970	Horace Winchell Magoun
 1969	Elizabeth C. Crosby
 1968	Theodore H. Bullock
 1967	George H. Bishop
 1966	Hans-Lukas Teuber
 1965	Giuseppe Moruzzi
 1964	Walle H . J. Nauta
 1963	Alexander Forbes
 1962	Philip Bard
 1961	Edgar Douglas Adrian
 1960	Heinrich Kluver
 1959	Rafael Lorente de Nó

See also

 List of neuroscience awards
 Kavli Prize
 Golden Brain Award
 Gruber Prize in Neuroscience
 W. Alden Spencer Award
 The Brain Prize
 Mind & Brain Prize
 Ralph W. Gerard Prize in Neuroscience

References

External links 
 American Philosophical Society, Lashley Award

Awards established in 1957
Neuroscience awards